Said al-Harumi or Saeed Alkharumi (10 January 1972 – 25 August 2021) was an Israeli Arab politician. He served as a member of the Knesset for the Joint List and the United Arab List in two spells between 2017 and 2021.

Biography
Al-Harumi was born in Shaqib al-Salam in southern Israel to a Muslim Negev Bedouin family. After attending a local elementary school, he went to high school in Jatt in the north of the country. He gained a BA in physics from the Hebrew University of Jerusalem, and returned to Shaqib al-Salam to teach in the local high school.

He became involved in politics and was elected to the local council, serving as head of the council between 2004 and 2008. He was also Secretary General of the United Arab List, and chairman of the political bureau of the southern branch of the Islamic Movement from 2002 until 2014, before becoming the deputy chairman of the United Arab List. He was placed fifteenth on the Joint List list (an alliance of Hadash, Balad, the United Arab List, and Ta'al) for the 2015 elections. Although the alliance won only 13 seats, al-Harumi entered the Knesset on 11 August 2017 as a replacement for Abdullah Abu Ma'aruf under the terms of a rotation agreement between the parties.

Al-Harumi was placed seventh on the list of the United Arab List–Balad alliance for the April 2019 elections, but lost his seat as the parties won only four seats. However, when the Joint List was re-established for the September 2019 elections, he was returned to the Knesset as the eleventh-placed candidate on its list. He was re-elected in the 2020 elections for the Joint List, and in the 2021 elections for the United Arab List after the UAL left the Joint List alliance. Despite the United Arab List joining the coalition government, he abstained from the vote to accept the new government on 13 June, in protest of planned demolitions of Bedouin homes in the Negev. As a consequence, the government was only installed by a single vote, 60-59. Party leader Mansour Abbas said al-Harumi's abstention was symbolic and that he would have voted in the coalition's favor had his vote been decisive. The following month he was elected chair of the Knesset's Internal Affairs and Environment Committee.

In August 2021 al-Harumi died from a heart attack at the Soroka Medical Center in Beersheba at the age of 49.

References

External links

1972 births
2021 deaths
Bedouin Israelis
Bedouin members of the Knesset
Hebrew University of Jerusalem alumni
Israeli educators
Joint List politicians
Members of the 20th Knesset (2015–2019)
Members of the 22nd Knesset (2019–2020)
Members of the 23rd Knesset (2020–2021)
Members of the 24th Knesset (2021–2022)
People from Shaqib al-Salam
United Arab List politicians